Akira Tsao Yu-ning (born 24 April 1994) is a Taiwanese actor, best known for his portrayal of Akira in the 2014 sports film Kano. Prior to his debut as an actor, Tsao was a professional baseball player, and played for Taiwan at international tournaments.

Career
Tsao was born in Taipei, Taiwan. He was a baseball player with intentions to compete at a professional level; in 2010, 16-year-old Tsao competed in the Asian AA Baseball Championship Champion. In 2012, he represented Taiwan for the U-18 Baseball World Cup. That same year, he was accepted by Fu Jen Catholic University and joined its baseball team.。

In 2013, Tsao was cast to star in the Taiwanese autobiographical baseball film Kano, directed by Umin Boya and produced by Wei Te-sheng. He won Best Supporting Actor for his performance as Akira at the 2014 Taipei Film Festival and was nominated for Best New Performer at the 51st Golden Horse Awards. He played for Taiwan in the 2014 U-23 Baseball World Cup, the 2015 Universiade, the Asian Baseball Championship, and the World Port Tournament.。

In 2017, Tsao left the Taiwanese team to focus on his acting career. He has since starred in dramas such as Befriend (2018) and Triad Princess (2019).

Filmography

Film

Dramas

References

External links
 
 
 Tsao Yu-Ning Weibo page 

1994 births
Living people
Taiwanese male television actors
Taiwanese male film actors
Male actors from Taipei
21st-century Taiwanese male actors
Fu Jen Catholic University alumni